The 2012 United States House of Representatives elections in Mississippi were held on Tuesday, November 6, 2012 and elected the four U.S. Representatives from the state of Mississippi. The elections coincided with the elections of other federal and state offices, including a quadrennial presidential election and an election to the U.S. Senate.

Overview

District 1
Republican Alan Nunnelee, who has represented Mississippi's 1st congressional district since January 2011, ran for re-election.

Republican primary

Candidates

Nominee
Alan Nunnelee, incumbent U.S. Representative

Eliminated in primary
Robert Estes, owner of Estes Grading and Trucking
Henry Ross, former Mayor of Eupora and candidate for this seat in 2010

Primary results

Democratic primary

Candidates

Nominee
Brad Morris, attorney and former chief of staff to former representative Travis Childers

Withdrawn
Mark DuVall, former state Representative

Primary results

Reform primary

Candidates

Nominee
Chris Potts

Libertarian primary

Candidates

Nominee
Danny Bedwell

Constitution primary

Candidates

Nominee
Jim Bourland

General election

Results

District 2
Democrat Bennie Thompson, who had represented Mississippi's 2nd congressional district since 1993, ran for re-election.

Democratic primary

Candidates

Nominee
Bennie Thompson, incumbent U.S. Representative

Eliminated in primary
Heather McTeer, Mayor of Greenville

Primary results

Republican primary

Candidates

Nominee
Bill Marcy, nominee for this seat in 2010

Primary results

Reform primary

Candidates

Nominee
Lajena Williams

Independents
Cobby Williams, motivational speaker

General election

Results

District 3
Republican Gregg Harper, who has represented Mississippi's 3rd congressional district since 2009, ran for re-election.

Republican primary
Robert Allen, a Tea Party activist, challenged Harper in the Republican primary.

Primary results

Democratic primary

Candidates

Nominee
Crystal Biggs

Primary results

Reform primary

Candidates

Nominee
John "Luke" Pannell

General election

Campaign
Crystal Biggs, who had received the Democratic nomination unopposed, dropped out of the race in September 2012 because of an illness.

Results

District 4
Republican Steven Palazzo, who has represented Mississippi's 4th congressional district since January 2011, ran for re-election.

Republican primary

Candidates

Nominee
Steven Palazzo, incumbent U.S. Representative

Eliminated in primary
Cindy Burleson, political activist;
Ron Vincent, Tea Party activist and retired engineer,

Declined
Chris McDaniel, state senator
Brian Sanderson, lawyer 
Michael Watson, state Senator

Primary results

Democratic primary

Candidates

Nominee
 Michael Herrington, service manager

Eliminated in primary
 Jason Vitosky, businessman

Declined
 Gene Taylor, former U.S. Representative

Primary results

Reform primary

Candidates

Nominee
Robert Claunch

Libertarian primary

Candidates

Nominee
Ron Williams, businessman and Republican candidate for governor in 2011

General election

Campaign
Herrington dropped out of the race in September 2012 because of his mother's illness and financial concerns. He was replaced as Democratic nominee by Matthew Moore, an honours student at Mississippi Gulf Coast Community College.

Results

References

External links
Elections from the Mississippi Secretary of State
United States House of Representatives elections in Mississippi, 2012 at Ballotpedia
Mississippi U.S. House at OurCampaigns.com
Campaign contributions for U.S. Congressional races in Mississippi at OpenSecrets
Outside spending at the Sunlight Foundation

Mississippi
2012
United States House